The Georgian Ice Hockey League is the national ice hockey league in the country of Georgia. The league was founded in 2007, and has been contested in the 2007–08 season and annually since the 2011–12 season

Participating teams
 Bakurianis Mimino
 Ice Knights Tbilisi
 Fiery Crusaders Tbilisi
 Grey Wolves Tbilisi

Champions
2007–08: Grey Wolves Tbilisi
2008–09 to 2010–11: Was not played
2011–12: Ice Knights Tbilisi
2012–13: Ice Knights Tbilisi
2013–14: Grey Wolves Tbilisi
2014–15: Bakurianis Mimino
2015–16: Unknown
2016–17: Grey Wolves Tbilisi

References

External links
hockey.ge

 
2007 establishments in Georgia (country)
Ice hockey in Georgia (country)
Top tier ice hockey leagues in Europe
Sports leagues established in 2007